was a  after Genryaku and before Kenkyū. This period spanned the years from August 1185 through April 1190.

Change of era
 1185 : The new era name was created to mark an event or a number of events.  The previous era ended and a new one commenced in Genryaku 2, on the 16th day of the 4th month of 1184.

Events of the Bunji era
 1185 (Bunji 1, 29th day of the 11th month): The court formally approves of establishment of a shogunate government at Kamakura in the Kantō region.

Notes

References
 Brown, Delmer and Ichiro Ishida. (1979). The Future and the Past: a translation and study of the 'Gukanshō', an interpretative history of Japan written in 1219.  Berkeley: University of California Press. ;  OCLC 5145872
 Kitagawa, Hiroshi and Bruce T. Tsuchida, eds. (1975). The Tale of the Heike. Tokyo: University of Tokyo Press.  	;   OCLC 193064639
 Nussbaum, Louis-Frédéric and Käthe Roth. (2005).  Japan encyclopedia. Cambridge: Harvard University Press. ;  OCLC 58053128
 Titsingh, Isaac. (1834). Nihon Odai Ichiran; ou,  Annales des empereurs du Japon.  Paris: Royal Asiatic Society, Oriental Translation Fund of Great Britain and Ireland. OCLC 5850691
 Varley, H. Paul. (1980). A Chronicle of Gods and Sovereigns: Jinnō Shōtōki of Kitabatake Chikafusa. New York: Columbia University Press.  ;  OCLC 6042764

External links
 National Diet Library, "The Japanese Calendar" -- historical overview plus illustrative images from library's collection

Japanese eras
1180s in Japan
1190s in Japan